Roscommon railway station serves the town of Roscommon in County Roscommon, Ireland.

The station is on the Dublin to Westport Rail service. Passengers to or from Galway travel to Athlone and change trains. Passengers to or from Ballina and Foxford travel to Manulla Junction and change trains.

History
The station opened on 13 February 1860.

See also
 List of railway stations in Ireland

References

External links
Irish Rail Roscommon Station Website

Iarnród Éireann stations in County Roscommon
Railway stations in County Roscommon
Railway stations opened in 1860
Roscommon (town)